Ballard's Ash is a hamlet in north Wiltshire, England. It lies just beyond the northern outskirts of Royal Wootton Bassett on the B4042 road towards Brinkworth and Malmesbury.

Hamlets in Wiltshire